The 2012 United States Senate election in Montana was held on November 6, 2012, alongside a presidential election, other elections to the United States Senate in other states, as well as elections to the United States House of Representatives and various state and local elections.

Incumbent Democratic Senator Jon Tester successfully ran for reelection to a second term, gaining 48.6% of the vote against Republican U.S. Representative Denny Rehberg who received 44.9% of the vote.

Democratic primary

Candidate 
 Jon Tester, incumbent U.S. Senator

Republican primary

Candidates 
 Denny Rehberg, U.S. Representative, former lieutenant governor, former state representative and nominee in 1996
 Dennis Teske, farmer

Withdrew 
 Steve Daines, businessman and 2008 Republican nominee for Lieutenant Governor of Montana (ran for the U.S. House of Representatives)

Endorsements

Results 
The Republican primary was held on June 5, 2012.

General election

Candidates 
 Dan Cox (Libertarian), retired businessman
 Denny Rehberg (Republican), U.S. Representative, former lieutenant governor and former state representative
 Jon Tester (Democratic), incumbent U.S. Senator and former state senator

Debates 
Three debates were scheduled, including one with the Libertarian candidate whose ultimate influence on the race remains uncertain. The first, between Rehberg and Tester, was held on October 8, 2012, at 7 p.m. at Petro Theatre at the MSU Billings University campus. The debate was televised live by Montana PBS andbroadcast on KEMC/Yellowstone Public Radio and streamed on the Gazette's website. It was moderated by Steve Prosinski, editor of The Gazette, with questions from a panel of political reporters. Representatives from the Associated Students of Montana State University Billings, the student government, served as timekeepers.

 Complete video of debate, October 8, 2012.
 Complete video of debate, October 20, 2012

Campaign 
Former president of the Montana Senate and farmer Jon Tester was elected with 49.2% of the vote in 2006, defeating incumbent Conrad Burns.

As of June 30, 2011, Jon Tester had saved $2.34 million in campaign funds. Tester has been accused by Republican Denny Rehberg's senate campaign of depending on financial contributions from Wall Street banking executives and movie stars.

On February 5, 2011, U.S. Representative Denny Rehberg announced his intention to run for the U.S. Senate. Steve Daines had announced he would seek the Republican nomination on November 13, 2010, but just before Rehberg's announcement he dropped out of the primary and announced he would instead seek the Republican nomination for Montana's at-large congressional district in 2012. Daines would later be elected in the other U.S. Senate seat two years later.

As of early July 2010, Denny Rehberg had saved $1.5 million of an original $2 million in campaign funds. Rehberg accused Democrat Jon Tester's senate campaign of depending on financial contributions from Wall Street banking executives and Hollywood while Rehberg's campaign relies primarily on in state donations. Tester's campaign countered that Rehberg has been funded by petroleum special interests and Wall Street.

The National Republican Senatorial Committee aired an attack ad against Jon Tester that mistakenly included a digitally manipulated photo of Tester (who has only two fingers on his left hand) with full sets of fingers. Another ad against Tester, from the Karl Rove group Crossroads GPS, falsely asserted that Tester had voted in favor of Environmental Protection Agency regulation of farm dust. In fact, Tester had praised the EPA for not attempting such a regulation. The vote cited in the anti-Tester ad concerned currency exchange rates.

In early October 2012, Crossroads GPS announced it would launch a $16 million advertising buy in national races, of which four were this and three other Senate elections.

Top contributors 
 Although organizations are listed here, it is illegal for corporations to contribute to federal campaigns. Only political action committees (PACs) and individuals may contribute to federal candidates and in limited amounts. These lists actually indicate aggregate contributions from the organizations' PACs, their individual members or employees or owners, and those individuals' immediate families.

Top industries

Predictions

Polling

Results 
Tester won re-election to a second term, albeit by a narrow margin. He received about 4% more of the vote than Republican Rehberg, but the difference in Tester and Rehberg's vote totals was less than the vote total of Libertarian Dan Cox, who received 6.6% of the vote.

By county 

Source:

See also 
 2012 United States Senate elections
 2012 United States House of Representatives election in Montana
 2012 Montana gubernatorial election

References

External links 
 Elections and Government at the Montana Secretary of State
 Candidate issue positions at On the Issues
 Outside spending at Sunlight Foundation
 Campaign contributions at OpenSecrets

Official campaign websites
 Denny Rehberg for U.S. Senate
 Jon Tester for U.S. Senate
 Dan Cox for U.S. Senate

2012
Montana
Senate